Sistas is an American comedy drama television series created, written and executive produced by Tyler Perry that premiered on October 23, 2019, on BET.

Cast and characters

Main
KJ Smith as Andrea "Andi" Barnes, a divorce attorney who goes into a relationship with a married man
Ebony Obsidian as Karen Mott, a hair salon owner in a complicated relationship as well as the love interest of a newly separated, married man
Mignon Von as Daniella "Danni" King, an abrasive and young at heart airline supervisor 
Novi Brown as Sabrina Hollins, a bank supervisor who falls in love with a man whose sexuality she questions 
Chido Nwokocha as Gary Marshall Borders, a married man who starts a relationship with Andi 
DeVale Ellis as Zac Taylor, Karen's ex whom he wants to get back with. He later breaks up with Karen and enters a solid relationship with Fatima
Brian Jordan Jr. as Maurice Webb, Sabrina's coworker and gay friend
Kevin Walton as Aaron Carter, Karen's married love interest
Anthony Dalton as Calvin Rodney, Sabrina's love interest
Crystal Renee Hayslett as Fatima Wilson, Andi's assistant and friend at the firm and Zac's love interest (season 2–present; recurring season 1)
Trinity Whiteside as Preston Horace, Danni's love interest (season 2–present; recurring season 1)
Chris Warren as Hayden Moss, Fatima's colleague and one-time fling who works with her in order to help Andi with her legal issues, he also become jealous of Fatima's relationship with Zac (season 5–present; recurring seasons 2-4)

Recurring
Jesse Lewis IV as Bootsy, (season 2)

Crystal-Lee Naomi as Jasmine Borders, Gary's wife who Andi represents before Jasmine learns about the affair with her husband (season 1; guest, seasons 2–3)
Angela Beyincé as Pam, Karen's assistant at the hair salon
Michael King as Don Bellamy, Andi's former boss (season 1; guest, season 2)
Madison McKinley as Fawn Carter, Aaron's wife (season 1)
Keena Ferguson	as Leslie Davenport, a private investigator (season 1)
Tobias Truvillion as Morris Hollis, a creepy criminal defense attorney (season 1)
Shari Belafonte as Lisa Mott, Karen's mother (seasons 1, 5)
Sean Poolman as Paris Johnson, Andi's love interest (seasons 1–2)
Skyh Alvester Black as Jacobi, Sabrina's love interest (seasons 2–3)
Mackenro Alexander as Que, Maurice's "fling" who is currently on the run for the robbery at the Brookhaven Bank (season 3-present)
Dion Rome as El Fuego, Danni's former collegemate, who works as a male stripper at Club Eden. His real name is Alonzo (seasons 3–4)
Tanya Chisholm as Jenna (season 4)
Eva Marcille as Marilyn "Madam" DeVille, Fatima's ruthless cousin who helps Andi with Sabrina's legal troubles, and the owner of Club Eden (season 5)

Crossovers
Bruh: KJ Smith reprised her role of Andrea "Andi" Barnes on the BET+ comedy series, Bruh (another series created by Tyler Perry). Andi made brief appearances with her work partner Mike Alexander, whom he and three other men are the central characters of that series. They both work at the same law firm though Mike is never mentioned or made an appearance in Sistas as of yet. Mike attempts to make many flirtatious advances at her during their off-site work meetings, but she declines assuring that she is a married woman.

All The Queens Men: Dion Rome guest appeared as exotic dancer El Fuego, (a character from the BET+ drama series All The Queens Men created by Christian Keyes and produced by Tyler Perry Studios) and became a recurring character in a minor role on Sistas in seasons 3 & 4. The nightclub "Club Eden" is shared between the two shows, with the women from Sistas making brief on location appearances there on their own series. However, it is the main setting  for All the Queen's Men where Marilyn "Madam" DeVille (played by Eva Marcille) is the owner of the club. She also manages many male exotic dancers (including El Fuego). Eva Marcille will also guest star in season 5 as Madam, who helps Andi out of a bind with Sabrina's legal troubles. She is the cousin of Fatima.

Episodes

Series overview

Season 1 (2019–20)

Season 2 (2020–21)

Season 3 (2021)

Season 4 (2022)

Season 5 (2022–23)

Production
On May 12, 2020, BET renewed the series for a second season, with Perry announcing that production would start on July 8, 2020. The second season premiered on October 14, 2020. On January 19, 2021, BET renewed the series for a third season. The third season premiered on June 9, 2021.

On October 20, 2021, BET renewed the series for a fourth season which premiered on January 5, 2022.

On March 22, 2022, BET renewed the series for a fifth season, which premiered on October 12, 2022.

Spin-off

On December 8, 2021, it was announced that BET+ ordered Zatima, a spin-off starring Devale Ellis as Zac Taylor and Crystal Renee Hayslett as Fatima Wilson. The series premiered on September 22, 2022.

References

External links

2019 American television series debuts
2010s American comedy-drama television series
2020s American comedy-drama television series
2010s American black television series
2020s American black television series
BET original programming
English-language television shows
Television series by Tyler Perry Studios
Television series created by Tyler Perry